Akvilė Gedraitytė (born 14 February 2001) is a Lithuanian professional racing cyclist, who currently rides for UCI Women's Continental Team . She rode in the women's junior time trial at the 2018 UCI Road World Championships and the 2019 UCI Road World Championships, and the women's time trial event at the 2020 UCI Road World Championships.

References

External links

2001 births
Living people
Lithuanian female cyclists
Place of birth missing (living people)